Ephesians 5 is the fifth chapter of the Epistle to the Ephesians in the New Testament of the Christian Bible. Traditionally, it is believed to be written by Apostle Paul while he was in prison in Rome (around AD 62).  More recently, it is suggested to be written between AD 80 and 100 by another writer using Paul's name and style, however this theory is not widely accepted. This chapter is a part of Paul's exhortation (Ephesians 4–6), with the particular section about how Christians should live in the world (4:17–5:20) and in their responsibilities as households (5:21–6:9).

Text
The original text was written in Koine Greek. This chapter is divided into 33 verses.

Textual witnesses
Some early manuscripts containing the text of this chapter are:
Papyrus 46 (c. 200)
Papyrus 49 (3rd century)
Codex Vaticanus (325–350)
Codex Sinaiticus (330–360)
Codex Alexandrinus (400–440)
Codex Freerianus (c. 450; extant verses 6–11, 20–24, 32–33)
Codex Claromontanus (c. 550)

Old Testament references
 :

Walking in the light (5:1–20)
This section provides an antithesis between the old and new life in three contrasts:
"life modelled on the love of God and Christ" vs. "life mismatched with vices" which causes God's anger (verses 1–7);
"life in the light" vs. "life full of hidden shamefulness" (verses 8–14);
an unwise life relying on strong drink vs. a wise life guided by the Spirit (verses 15–20).

Verse 14

Verse 14 may be a snatch of an early hymn. Charles Wesley describes "one who sleeps" as "a sinner satisfied in his sins; contented to remain in his fallen state".

Verse 16

Verse 17

Verse 18

Biblical theologian James Dunn notes a comparison between this exhortation and Pentecost day as it is recounted in Acts 2: "As at Pentecost the effect of the Spirit could give an impression of drunkenness. The difference is that strong drink taken in excess resulted in debauchery and dissipation", whereas fullness of the Spirit came to expression most characteristically in ... praise [of God] from the heart, and life lived in a spirit of thankfulness to God.

Household rules (5:21–33)
Stretching to Ephesians 6:9, this part is built on "the tabulated framework of the rules for good household management rules", acknowledging a household as the basic unit of a society. The health and stability of the society (and also the state) depend on the "basic relationships within the household: "husband and wife", "father and children", "master and slaves". The good ethics in the Christian households, unlike in non-Christian ones, "have to be lived 'in the Lord', patterned after the unselfish, sacrificial love of Christ".

Verse 22

Verse 25
{{quote|Husbands, love your wives, just as Christ also loved the church and gave Himself for her,}}

Verse 27and that He might present to Himself a glorious church, not having spot, or wrinkle, or any such thing, but that it should be holy and without blemish."He": translated from the Greek pronoun , autos'', which focuses attention on Christ as the one who makes the church glorious.
"Without blemish": that is, "without any fault to be found in her"; apparently alluding to the sacrifices (cf. Song of Solomon 4:7).

Verse 28

 "As their own bodies": like a common Jewish saying that a man's wife is, "as his own body"; and it is one of the precepts of their wise men, that a man should honour his wife more than his body, and "love her as his body"; for as they also say, they are but one body; the apostle seems to speak in the language of his countrymen, as his doctrine and theirs agree in this point.
 "He that loves his wife loves himself": because she is one body and flesh with him.

See also
 Christian marriage
 Jesus Christ
 Related Bible parts: Genesis 2, Genesis 3, Jeremiah 8, Jeremiah 23, Ephesians 6, Colossians 3, 1 Peter 3.

References

Bibliography

External links
 King James Bible - Wikisource
English Translation with Parallel Latin Vulgate
Online Bible at GospelHall.org (ESV, KJV, Darby, American Standard Version, Bible in Basic English)
Multiple bible versions at Bible Gateway (NKJV, NIV, NRSV etc.)

05